BZP may refer to:

 Benzylpiperazine, a recreational drug
 The IATA airport code for the city of Breezy Point, Minnesota
 Bright zinc plating, a form of galvanization